João de Deus Rogado Salvador Pinheiro, GCC GCIH (born 11 July 1945), is a Portuguese politician and former Member of the European Parliament for the Social Democratic Party–People's Party coalition; part of the European People's Party–European Democrats group.

Academic career
João de Deus Pinheiro has a licentiate degree in chemical-industrial engineering by the Instituto Superior Técnico (1970) and a doctorate degree in the same field by the University of Birmingham (1976). Professor at the University of Lourenço Marques (Mozambique) from 1970 to 1974, and in the University of Minho after the Carnation Revolution and his return to Portugal.

Political career
He was Minister for Education 1985–1987, Minister for Foreign Affairs 1987–1992; in that role he was one of the EU negotiators in Brioni Agreement that ended ten-day war in Slovenia in 1991; Member of the European Parliament and European Commissioner.

Life after politics
João de Deus Pinheiro was elected member of the Assembly of the Republic in 2009 elections for Braga District, but resigned shortly after for health reasons.

After leaving the European Parliament, he has been member of the board of several companies.

He is also known as a writer and amateur golfer.

References

1945 births
People from Lisbon
Living people
Portuguese European Commissioners
Social Democratic Party (Portugal) MEPs
MEPs for Portugal 2004–2009
Instituto Superior Técnico alumni
Education ministers of Portugal
Portuguese chemical engineers
Academic staff of the University of Minho